Béoué-Zibiao is a town in western Ivory Coast. It is a sub-prefecture of Bangolo Department in Guémon Region, Montagnes District.

Béoué-Zibiao was a commune until March 2012, when it became one of 1126 communes nationwide that were abolished.

In 2014, the population of the sub-prefecture of Béoué-Zibiao was 21,927.

Villages
The 16 villages of the sub-prefecture of Béoué-Zibiao and their population in 2014 are:

Notes

Sub-prefectures of Guémon
Former communes of Ivory Coast